Sami Vatanen (born 3 June 1991) is a Finnish professional ice hockey defenceman for Genève-Servette HC of the National League (NL). He was drafted in the fourth round, 106th overall, by the Anaheim Ducks at the 2009 NHL Entry Draft, and played in NHL for the Anaheim Ducks, New Jersey Devils, Carolina Hurricanes and Dallas Stars. He previously played in his native Finland for JYP, where he won the 2012 SM-liiga Championship.

Internationally, Vatanen has represented Finland and was part of the Gold medal winning teams at the 2022 Bejing Winter Olympics, and the 2022 IIHF World Championships.

Playing career
Vatanen was drafted by the Anaheim Ducks in the fourth round of the 2009 NHL Entry Draft. The following season, he earned a spot on defending Finnish champions JYP's roster. He broke a record for most points by a rookie defenceman in the Finnish SM-liiga regular season and playoffs.

Vatanen made his NHL debut with Anaheim in the lockout-shortened 2012–13 season, on 1 February 2013. Vatanen was also selected to the AHL First All-Star Team and the AHL All-Rookie Team, despite playing in just 62 games of the 76-game season.

On 22 July 2014, Vatanen signed a new two-year, $2.525 million contract with Anaheim. He recorded 12 goals and 25 assists during the 2014–15 season, his first full NHL season.

At the completion of the 2015–16 season, Vatanen amassed a new career high with 38 points in 71 games. As a restricted free agent, on 18 June 2016, he signed a new four-year contract with Anaheim.

On 30 November 2017, during the 2017–18 season, Vatanen was traded (along with a conditional third-round pick in 2019 or 2020) to the New Jersey Devils in exchange for Joseph Blandisi, Adam Henrique and a third-round pick in 2018. He finished the season with 32 points in 72 games.

On 24 February 2020, Vatanen was traded to the Carolina Hurricanes in exchange for Janne Kuokkanen, Fredrik Claesson and a conditional 2020 fourth-round pick. He appeared in seven postseason games for the club, recording three assists.

On 7 January 2021, Vatanen returned to the Devils on a one-year $2 million contract. On 12 April, Vatanen was claimed off waivers by the Dallas Stars.

On 26 September 2021, Vatanen signed a one-year contract with Genève-Servette HC of the Swiss National League (NL).

International play

In 2010, Vatanen represented Finland internationally at the junior level (2010 World Junior Championships held in Saskatchewan) and at the senior level (2010 World Championships held in Germany). At the end of the 2009–10 season, Vatanen also became the highest-drafted Finnish player in Kontinental Hockey League (KHL) history when he was selected second overall in the 2010 KHL Junior Draft by Metallurg Novokuznetsk.

At the 2014 Winter Olympics in Sochi, Vatanen won a bronze medal when Finland defeated the United States 5–0.

Vatanen represented Finland at the 2016 World Cup of Hockey held in Toronto in September 2016.

Vatanen represented Finland at the 2022 Winter Olympics, where Finland beat Russia to win Olympic Gold.

Career statistics

Regular season and playoffs

International

Awards and honours

References

External links

1991 births
Living people
Anaheim Ducks draft picks
Anaheim Ducks players
Carolina Hurricanes players
Dallas Stars players
Finnish ice hockey defencemen
Genève-Servette HC players
Ice hockey players at the 2014 Winter Olympics
Ice hockey players at the 2022 Winter Olympics
JYP Jyväskylä players
Medalists at the 2014 Winter Olympics
Medalists at the 2022 Winter Olympics
New Jersey Devils players
Norfolk Admirals players
Olympic gold medalists for Finland
Olympic bronze medalists for Finland
Olympic ice hockey players of Finland
Olympic medalists in ice hockey
Sportspeople from Jyväskylä